Norwegian Radiation Protection Authority (abbreviated to NRPA) is a Norwegian public agency under the Ministry of Health and Care Services headquartered in Østerås, Bærum municipality, Greater Oslo Region. It works as an authority in the area of radiation protection and nuclear safety.  NRPA falls under the Ministry of Health and Care Services, but serves all ministries and departments on issues relating to radiation.

History
The NRPA was created on January 1, 1993 through the consolidation of the former Nuclear Energy Safety Authority with the National institute of Radiation Hygiene.

Structure
The NRPA is responsible for: overseeing the use of radioactive substances and fissile material, coordinating contingency plans against nuclear accidents and radioactive fallout, monitoring natural and artificial radiation in the environment and at the workplace, increasing our knowledge of the occurrence as well as monitoring risk and effects of radiation. It has regional offices in Tromsø and Sør-Varanger and is divided into three sections: 
Department of Emergency Preparedness and Environmental Radioactivity
Department of Radiation Protection and Nuclear Safety
Department of Planning and Administration

International cooperation
NRPA is involved in extensive international cooperation. This includes cooperation on standards of management, but also a growing collaboration on research across borders. NRPA cooperates with International Commission on Radiological Protection (ICRP), and International Atomic Energy Agency (IAEA).

References

External links
 Official website (Norwegian)

Government agencies established in 1993
Medical research institutes in Norway
Public Health
Radiation protection organizations